Thomas Mack Lauderdale (born July 14, 1970) is an American musician and pianist, largely known for his work with his Portland-based band Pink Martini.

Early life
Thomas Mack Lauderdale was born in 1970 in Oakland, California, and adopted by Kerby Roy and Linda Sue, née Mikesell. In 1972, the family moved to Indiana, where his father was pastor at "Eel River Church of the Brethren". After church services, Lauderdale usually went to the piano, and tried to replicate the hymns he heard. His parents bought for him an upright piano at an auction and so he began his formal musical studies at age six with Patricia Garrison of North Manchester, Indiana and later, Joyanne Jones at Indiana University/Purdue University in Fort Wayne, Indiana.

In 1976, his father resigned from the ministry and the Lauderdale family opened a plant nursery near North Manchester. The family moved to Portland, Oregon in 1982, after his parents divorced and his father came out of the closet. In the 1990s, his parents went on several talk shows – including 20/20, Oprah, Jane Whitney, and Christina - to talk about what happens when a spouse comes out. Kerby returned to the ministry, and is the first openly gay pastor in his denomination. He performed the service when his former wife Linda remarried in 2000.

Education
In Portland, Oregon Lauderdale began his studies with Sylvia Killman in 1982. Killman and Lauderdale remain close friends. Lauderdale won the "Oregon Symphony's annual Corbett Competition" in 1985, marking the beginning of a long association with conductor Norman Leyden. He graduated from Portland's "Ulysses S. Grant" High School in 1988, where he was student body president and editor of The Grantonian. Lauderdale studied at Harvard University, where he graduated cum laude with a degree in History and Literature.

"Pink Martini" band

After seeing the Del Rubio Triplets on Pee-Wee Herman's Christmas Special, Lauderdale arranged for them to travel to Portland, Oregon in October 1994 to give a series of concerts at retirement homes, nursing homes, and hospitals. After a week of performances and appearances, the Del Rubio Triplets performed at a fundraising concert at Cinema 21 in Northwest Portland. Stuck for an opening act for the group, Lauderdale threw on a Betsey Johnson cocktail dress, and joined by a bass player, a bongo player, and a singer, took to the stage as Pink Martini.

Pink Martini's first concerts were often politically motivated, with performances at events for progressive causes such as the environment, affordable housing, civil rights, libraries, and public broadcasting. The band remains committed to its progressive and political roots. FundFest is a biennial four-day concert series produced by the band to raise money and visibility for four different organizations. Past recipients include Reach Community Development, Oregon Public Broadcasting, the ALS Association of Oregon and SW Washington, Children's Cancer Association, the Bicycle Transportation Alliance, Friends of Trees, and KBOO Community Radio.

Pink Martini has grown from four musicians to its current twelve. Singer China Forbes – who Lauderdale met at the college, Harvard University – joined the band in 1995. The band has performed its multi-lingual repertoire on concert stages and with symphony orchestras throughout Europe, Asia, Greece, Turkey, Lebanon, Tunisia, Australia, Canada and the United States. In 1998, the ensemble made its European debut at the Cannes Film Festival, as well as its orchestral debut with the Oregon Symphony under the direction of Norman Leyden. Pink Martini has since performed with over 50 symphony orchestras around the world including the Boston Pops, the Hollywood Bowl Orchestra, the Los Angeles Philharmonic, the BBC Orchestra, and with the National Symphony Orchestra at the Kennedy Center in Washington. Other appearances include two sold-out concerts at Carnegie Hall in 2007 & 2009; the grand opening of the Los Angeles Philharmonic's Frank Gehry-designed Walt Disney Concert Hall, with return sold-out engagements for New Year's Eve 2003, 2004, 2008, 2011 & 2014; the opening party of the New York Museum of Modern Art; the Governor's Ball at the 80th Annual Academy Awards in 2008; the opening of the 2008 Sydney Festival in Australia; two sold-out concerts at Paris' legendary Olympia theatre in 2011; and Paris' fashion house Lanvin's 10-year anniversary celebration for designer Alber Elbaz in 2012.

The band has collaborated and performed with numerous artists, such as Jimmy Scott, Carol Channing, Rufus Wainwright, Martha Wainwright, Jane Powell, Henri Salvador, Chavela Vargas, New York performer Joey Arias, puppeteer Basil Twist, Georges Moustaki, Michael Feinstein, filmmaker Gus Van Sant, Courtney Taylor, Taylor of The Dandy Warhols, clarinetist and conductor Norman Leyden, Japanese legend Hiroshi Wada, Italian actress and songwriter Alba Clemente, DJ Johnny Dynell and Chi Chi Valenti, NPR White House Correspondent Ari Shapiro, the original cast of Sesame Street, March Fourth Marching Band, The von Trapps, the Bonita Vista High School Marching Band from Chula Vista, California, and the Pacific Youth Choir of Portland, Oregon.

Albums
Pink Martini has released seven studio albums and one live concert DVD on the band's own record label, Heinz Records and partnered with other labels worldwide, including Naïve Records in France, Wrasse Records in the United Kingdom and South America, Audiogram in Canada, Urtext in Mexico, Random Records in Argentina and Chile, Inertia Recordings in Australia and New Zealand, Ales in Korea, and Top 2 in Southeast Asia.  The band's debut album Sympathique was released in 1997, and received nominations for "Song of the Year" and "Best New Artist" in France's Victoires de la Musique awards.  Sympathique (1997), Hang on Little Tomato (2004), and Hey Eugene! (2007), Splendor In The Grass (2009) and Joy To The World (2010) have all gone gold in France, Turkey, Greece, and Canada selling over 2.5 million copies worldwide.

In Fall 2011 the band released two albums – A Retrospective, a collection of the band's most beloved songs spanning their 17-year career, which includes eight previously unreleased tracks, and 1969, an album of collaborations with legendary Japanese singer Saori Yuki. 1969 has been certified platinum in Japan, reaching #2 on the Japanese charts with the Japan Times raving "the love and respect Saori Yuki and Pink Martini have for the pop tradition shines through on every track."

Individual appearances
In addition to his work with Pink Martini, Lauderdale has collaborated with cabaret performer and singer Meow Meow, the surf band Satan's Pilgrims and writer Tom Spanbauer. In Spring 2008, he completed his first film score for Chiara Clemente's documentary Our City Dreams, a portrait of five New York City-based women artists of different generations. In 2008, he performed as the featured piano soloist in Beethoven's Choral Fantasy with the Choral Arts Ensemble of Portland under the direction of Roger Doyle, and Gershwin's Concerto in F with the Oregon Symphony under the direction of Christoph Campestrini. In 2011 Lauderdale again appeared as the featured soloist with the Oregon Symphony, this time under the direction of Carlos Kalmar.

He has appeared as soloist with numerous orchestras and ensembles, including the Oregon Symphony, the Seattle Symphony, the Portland Youth Philharmonic, Chamber Music Northwest, the Choral Arts Ensemble of Portland and Oregon Ballet Theatre (where he collaborated with choreographer James Canfield and visual artists Storm Tharp and Malia Jensen on a ballet based on the original story of Bambi, written by Felix Salten in 1923).

Political activism
Beginning in high school, Lauderdale became interested in politics. He worked in Portland City Hall, first under Mayor J.E. "Bud" Clark in the office of international relations, and later under City Commissioner Gretchen Kafoury on the city's civil rights ordinance. He was appointed by Oregon governor Neil Goldschmidt to the Juvenile Justice Advisory Committee; by Mayor Clark to the Metropolitan Youth Commission and by City Commissioner Mike Lindberg to the Public Safety in the Parks Task Force. In 1992, he was involved in the No on 9 and No on 13 Campaigns, in response to measures that would amend the Oregon constitution to declare homosexuality illegal.

In June 2009, Lauderdale organized a rally of support for Portland Mayor Sam Adams, the first openly gay mayor of a major American city. Adams had been caught up in an alleged sex scandal with intern Beau Breedlove, the times reports that the "Oregonian, the local police union and JustOut, a local gay periodical" were calling for his resignation. Portlanders at Lauderdale's rally compared Adams to Bill Clinton, saying he only lied about sex and should not resign.

In October 2011, Lauderdale and Pink Martini organized and performed at a rally in support of the Occupy movement. The rally took place in downtown Portland, OR in Pioneer Courthouse Square and included speeches and performances by Storm Large as well as Oregon congressmen Earl Blumenauer & Peter DeFazio.

Personal life
Lauderdale lives in the Harker Building, a 9,600 square foot building in the downtown’s  commercial district in Portland, Oregon.

See also
 List of LGBT people from Portland, Oregon

References

External links
A second sip of Pink Martini
Pink Martini bandleader Thomas Lauderdale teams up with the Oregon Symphony
Saori Yuki wants a kayōkyoku wave

1970 births
Living people
American adoptees
Grant High School (Portland, Oregon) alumni
Harvard University alumni
American people of Japanese descent
Musicians from Portland, Oregon
Pink Martini members
American LGBT musicians
American LGBT people of Asian descent